Peter Mucklow (born 5 November 1949) is an English former first-class cricketer.

Mucklow was born at Edgbaston in November 1949 and educated at Shrewsbury School. While studying at Trinity College at the University of Oxford, he made two appearances in first-class cricket for Oxford University against Surrey and Middlesex in 1970. He scored 48 runs in these two matches, with a high score of 32. In addition to playing first-class cricket, Mucklow also played minor counties cricket for Shropshire from 1968 and 1969, making ten appearances in the Minor Counties Championship, while playing at club level for Bridgnorth.

References

External links

1949 births
Living people
People from Edgbaston
Alumni of Trinity College, Oxford
English cricketers
Shropshire cricketers
Oxford University cricketers